John Morgan Landrum (July 3, 1815October 7, 1861) was a Democratic U.S. Representative from Louisiana serving in the 36th Congress. Shortly after Louisiana seceded from the Union in January 1861, Landrum vacated his seat.

Life and career
Born in Edgefield District, South Carolina, Landrum pursued classical studies at South Carolina College (now the University of South Carolina) at Columbia, graduating in 1842. He taught school for several years as he studied law. He was admitted to the bar in 1844 and commenced practice in Shreveport, Louisiana.

Political career
He served one term as mayor of Shreveport in 1848 and 1849.

Landrum was elected in November 1859 as a Democrat to the 36th Congress, taking 73% of the vote against Opposition Party candidate M.A. Jones. He remained absent from Congress from February 5, 1861, to the end of the 36th Congress following Louisiana's secession from the Union.

Later career and death
He continued to practice law until his death in Shreveport on October 7, 1861. Two weeks prior to his death, Landrum was involved in a serious buggy accident in which he broke his leg.

He was interred in Oakland Cemetery in Shreveport.

References

External links
 
 

1815 births
1861 deaths
People from Edgefield County, South Carolina
University of South Carolina alumni
Democratic Party members of the United States House of Representatives from Louisiana
Mayors of Shreveport, Louisiana
19th-century American politicians